Symbolic may refer to:

 Symbol, something that represents an idea, a process, or a physical entity

Mathematics, logic, and computing
 Symbolic computation, a scientific area concerned with computing with mathematical formulas
 Symbolic dynamics, a method for modeling dynamical systems by a discrete space consisting of infinite sequences of abstract symbols
 Symbolic execution, the analysis of computer programs by tracking symbolic rather than actual values
 Symbolic link, a special type of file in a computer memory storage system
 Symbolic logic, the use of symbols for logical operations in logic and mathematics

Music
 Symbolic (Death album), a 1995 album by the band Death
 Symbolic (Voodoo Glow Skulls album), a 2000 album by the band Voodoo Glow Skulls

Social sciences
 Symbolic anthropology, the study of cultural symbols and how those symbols can be interpreted to better understand a particular society
 Symbolic capital, the resources available to an individual on the basis of honor, prestige or recognition in sociology and anthropology
 Symbolic interaction, a system of interaction in sociology
 Symbolic system, a structured system of symbols in anthropology, sociology and psychology
 The Symbolic or Symbolic Order, Jacques Lacan's attempt to contrast with The Imaginary and The Real in psychoanalysis

See also
 Symbol (disambiguation)
 Symbolism (disambiguation)
 Symbolic representation (disambiguation)